BGH Capital (BGH) is an Australian private equity company established in 2017 by Robin Bishop, Ben Gray, and Simon Harle. BGH is headquartered in Melbourne and is owned and managed by its founding partners.

Ben Gray and Simon Harle established and led the Australian and New Zealand private equity team at TPG Capital, while Robin Bishop was previously head of Macquarie Capital Australia and New Zealand.

BGH Capital Fund I had a final close of approximately A$2.6 billion in May 2018. BGH Capital Fund II closed in February 2022 at $3.6 billion.

Investments 
In 2019, BGH purchased Perth-based education provider Navitas in a $2.3 billion deal with AustralianSuper and invested in CyberCX, a cyber security services firm.

In 2020, BGH acquired Healius' medical practices (now known as For Health), purchased a stake in online travel agency TripADeal – a 51% stake in TripADeal was sold to Qantas in 2022 – and acquired Abano Healthcare Group and a majority stake in Village Roadshow.

In 2021, BGH acquired dental chain 1300SMILES, and invested in Melbourne-based bakery Laurent and Australian chicken producer Hazeldene's.

In 2022, BGH acquired Bupa NZ's dental business and Virtus Health, which was de-listed from the ASX. It also took a stake in Pushpay.

References

See also
 Robin Gray (Australian politician) – father of BGA co-founder Ben Gray

Companies based in Melbourne
Private equity firms of Australia
2017 establishments in Australia
Financial services companies established in 2017